Estadio Regional de Chinquihue is a multi-use stadium in Puerto Montt, Chile.  It is currently used mostly for football matches and is the home stadium of Deportes Puerto Montt.  The stadium was built in 1982, with an original capacity of 11,300. In 2011 and 2013 it was completely renovated, and currently holds 10,000 people (all seated). The highest ever recorded attendance was 12,217 in a league match between Deportes Puerto Montt and Colo-Colo on September 6, 1998.

Regional de Chinquihue
Regional de Chinquihue
Puerto Montt